The 2012–13 season was Doncaster Rover's 10th consecutive season in The Football League. Doncaster were relegated at the end of the 2011–12 season, ending a four-year stay in the Championship. They finished the season as Champions thus gaining promotion back to the second tier.

League One

Standings

Results summary

Result round by round

Squad

Detailed Overview
As of 25 February 2013

Statistics

|-
|colspan="14"|Players currently out on loan:

|-
|colspan="14"|Players who have left the club:

|}

Captains

Goalscorers

Disciplinary record

Contracts

Transfers

In

Loans In

Out

Loans out

Fixtures

Pre-season

League One

FA Cup

Football League Cup

Football League Trophy

References

2012–13
2012–13 Football League One by team